Dinara Zhorobekova is a Kyrgyzstan Student who represented Turkey at the 2013 G20 Summit.

She is honoured in BBC'S 100 Women in 2013.

References 

Year of birth missing (living people)
Living people
21st-century Kyrgyzstani women
BBC 100 Women